WAFF may refer to:

Tylwyth Waff, a character in the Dune universe
WAFF (TV), a television station (channel 15, virtual 48) licensed to Huntsville, Alabama, United States
Royal West African Frontier Force, a former British Army regiment
West Asian Football Federation, an association for football in West Asia